Nabû-šumu-libūr, inscribed dAG.MU-li-bur or dna-bi-um-MU-li-bur, meaning "O Nabû, may (my) progeny / the son stay in good health," (ruled  1029–1022 BC) was the 11th and last king of the 2nd Dynasty of Isin, the 4th Dynasty of Babylon. He ruled during a period of instability due to incursions of Aramean nomadic tribesmen in Northwest Babylonia.

Biography
There is very little extant material for his reign. The legal text pictured is from his first year. It was found at Kār-Bēlet-Ilāni near Nippur, and details the reimbursement of Nusku-zêra-iddina, the šandabakku, or governor of Nippur, with land, after he ransomed a man named Mudammiqu from the 'enemy'. The price was paid in kind, with the text listing various items provided by the purchaser with their cash equivalent, for a total of 420 shekels. It was first published in 1983 and the text provides the earliest recorded price for iron, where an iron dagger of unspecified weight was valued at two shekels of silver. It was witnessed by eleven individuals representing the roll call for the elite in Nippur and the god Ninurta is invoked as patron deity of boundaries.

A stone duck weight inscribed Nabû-šuma-libūr, optimistically titled šar kiššati (king of the world), found its way to the Northwest palace of Nimrud, where it was preserved as an antique and rediscovered by Layard in the mid 19th century, and perhaps indicates continued trade. It was marked 30 minas (about 15 kilograms).

Ominous portents dated for his reign, are included in a damaged Religious Chronicle of the Seleucid era. It records, "a lion was lying lurking and they killed it," a prophecy fulfilled by the fall of the dynasty. The events at the end of his reign are not known, but northern Babylonia had been overrun by Aramean tribesmen from the west, and the dynasty was followed by the 2nd Dynasty of Sealand when a substantial part of southern Mesopotamia seceded.

Inscriptions

Notes

References

11th-century BC Babylonian kings
11th-century BC deaths
Year of birth unknown
Kings of the Universe